Pratz is a small town in the commune of Préizerdaul, in western Luxembourg.  , the town has a population of 347.

Préizerdaul
Towns in Luxembourg